Undeniable was a professional wrestling pay-per-view (PPV) event promoted by Ring of Honor (ROH). It took place on October 6, 2007 from the Inman Sports Club in Edison, New Jersey and aired on PPV on January 18, 2008.

Results

See also
2007 in professional wrestling
List of Ring of Honor pay-per-view events

References

External links
Official site for PPV
ProWrestlingHIstory Results

Undeniable, ROH
Professional wrestling in New Jersey
2007 in New Jersey
Events in New Jersey
October 2007 events in the United States
2007 Ring of Honor pay-per-view events